Skip-It is a children's toy invented by Avi Arad, Maggie Harvey and Mel Kennedy and manufactured by Tiger Electronics.  The Skip-It apparatus was designed to be affixed to the child's ankle via a small plastic hoop and spun around in a 360 degree rotation while continuously skipped by the user.  Time magazine included it in their 100 greatest toys ever.

During its initial release in the 1980s, the Skip-It apparatus became a commercial success through its advertisements on daytime Nickelodeon broadcasting as well as other children's programming.

It was based on 1960s toy Lemon Twist, which featured a lemon-shaped weight which was spun round the ankle.

During a second production occurring in the early 1990s—that was referred to by the then-CEO as a "Skip-It Renaissance"—the toy was manufactured with a counter on the Skip-It ball to record the number of skips. As a result, sales doubled from the late 1980s.  Some Skip-Its had colorful glitter filled and covered plastic decorations that can be slid on in order to make colorful patterns while being twirled about. There were also ribbon streamers, charms and stickers to decorate Skip Its, which were discontinued sometime in 2009.

A version of the toy was featured in the Hong Kong martial art movie Butterfly and Sword (1993) where the character Miu Siu Siu / Ho Ching is seen playing with it.  

In 2013, a spin-off of the board game Twister was developed, Twister Rave Skip-It.

References

Physical activity and dexterity toys
1980s toys
1990s toys